Channel 21, or TV 21 or TV21 may refer to:

 Channel 21 (Germany), a television channel in Germany; formerly known as "RTL Shop"
 TV 21 (North Macedonia), a television channel in North Macedonia
 El Watania 2, a television channel in Tunisia; formerly known as "Canal 21"
 L'Équipe 21, a television channel in France
 ETC-21, a television station in Quezon City, Philippines
 Canal Orbe 21, a television station in Buenos Aires, Argentina; formerly known as "Canal 21"
 Citytv Bogota, a television station in Bogota, Colombia
 Enlace Nicaragua, a Christian television station in Nicaragua
 TV Century 21, a weekly British children's comic published during the 1960s

Canada
 CHNU-DT-1, virtual channel 21 in Victoria, British Columbia
 CJON-DT, virtual channel 21 in St. John's, Newfoundland and Labrador

Mexico
 XHTIT-TDT, virtual channel 21, carries Azteca 7 in Tijuana, Baja California
 XHCDM-TDT, virtual channel 21 in Mexico City

UHF frequencies covering 512-518 MHz
 Channel 21 TV stations in Canada
 Channel 21 TV stations in Mexico
 Channel 21 digital TV stations in the United States
 Channel 21 low-power TV stations in the United States

Other uses
 TV21, an early 1980s British new wave band

See also
 21 (disambiguation)
 Channel 21 branded TV stations in the United States
 Channel 21 virtual TV stations in the United States

 21